SMS G102 was a German Torpedo boat that was sunk as a target by US army S.E.5 aircraft in the Atlantic Ocean off Cape Henry, Virginia, United States on 13 July 1921 after having been salvaged as war reparations following her failed scuttling in Scapa Flow two years prior.

Construction 
G102 was launched on 16 September 1914 and completed on 8 April 1915 at the Friedrich Krupp Germaniawerft A. G. shipyard in Kiel, German Empire as part of the G101 torpedo boat class. Despite being Torpedo boats, the ships were commonly referred to as destroyers instead. Initially built as the San Luis intended for Argentine service, her destiny was altered when Germany entered World War I and was in need of the San Luis which was renamed to G102. The ship could generate 24,900 s.h.p. with a speed of 33 knots. Her armament consisted of 4 x 8.8 cm guns (which were later increased to 10.5 cm), 6 x 50 cm Torpedo tubes and 24 mines.

World War I Career 
G102 was completed at the same time as her three sister ships G101, G103 and G104. All were entered into the 2nd Torpedo Boat Flotilla alongside eight B 97-class destroyers, but both classes mostly operated separately. Despite this all ships of the Flotilla unit were present at the Battle of Jutland on 31 May 1916. G102 went on to barely survive the war as she was badly damaged after hitting a mine in the English Channel on 15 February 1918 which killed 6 of her crew. G102 alongside her sister ships and most of the German Fleet were interned at Scapa Flow on 22 November 1918 following the German surrender, marking the end of world war I.

Scuttling Attempt At Scapa Flow And End 

While being anchored in Scapa Flow awaiting the result of a treaty to end the war formally, the German Imperial Navy decided to scuttle her fleet instead of having it distributed between the victorious powers on 21 June 1919. The following event ended with most of the German fleet being either sunk or beached. G102 was the only ship of her class which failed to scuttle herself, instead being beached by intervening British guard ships during her attempt. Of the 74 interned vessels at Scapa Flow, 52 managed to scuttle themselves with their wrecks being either salvaged, scrapped or left as future diving sites.

She was refloated and turned over to the United States Navy as War reparations in 1920 alongside other salvaged ships from Scapa Flow.

Gallery

References

Bibliography
 
 

1914 ships
Torpedo boats of the Imperial German Navy
World War I torpedo boats of Germany
Torpedo boats
Maritime incidents in 1918
Maritime incidents in 1919
Maritime incidents in 1921
Ships built in Kiel
Ships built in Germany
Shipwrecks in the Atlantic Ocean
World War I warships scuttled at Scapa Flow
Ships sunk by US aircraft
Ships sunk as targets
Ships sunk by aircraft as targets
Ships sunk with no fatalities